Yeldos or Eldos (Kazakh or Russian: Елдос) is a Kazakh male given name that may refer to

Yeldos Akhmetov (born 1990), Kazakh football defender
Yeldos Ikhsangaliyev (born 1978), Kazakh judoka
Yeldos Smetov (born 1992), Kazakh judoka

See also
 Eldho
 Eldo